2019 Abu Dhabi T10 was the third season of the Abu Dhabi T10. The matches had a 10-over-a-side format with a time duration of 90 minutes. The tournament was played as a round robin followed by semifinals and the final. It was played from 15 to 24 November 2019 at the Sheikh Zayed Cricket Stadium.

The Sindhis, Bengal Tigers and Pakhtoons were replaced by newly formed Deccan Gladiators, Delhi Bulls and Bangla Tigers teams respectively. Another new team named Qalandars was added on 22 September 2019. They were owned by the same franchise that owns Lahore Qalandars. Kerala Knights, Punjabi Legends and Rajputs were replaced by Karnataka Tuskers and Team Abu Dhabi.

Squads

Group stage

Group A

Group B

Super league

 Advanced to Qualifier Advanced to Eliminator 1

Playoffs

Qualifier

Eliminators
Eliminator 1

Eliminator 2

3rd place playoff

Final

References

External links
 Series home at ESPNCricinfo

2019 in Emirati cricket
Abu Dhabi T10 League